Fixed station (also. fixed radio station) is a station in the fixed service. Each station is classified by the service in which it operates permanently or temporarily.

Gallery

References / sources 

 International Telecommunication Union (ITU)
 

Radio stations and systems ITU

de:Funkstelle#Begriffsbestimmung